OOC may refer to:

Out of context, logical fallacy
Out of character, breaking character in theatrics and roleplay
Original Omnibus Company, a range of scale-model Buses and Trams released by Corgi Classics
Occupational Outlook Handbook, publication by U.S. Department of Labor
Old Oak Common, an area of London 
Old Oak Common TMD, railway depot in that area
Old Oak Common railway station, a planned railway station in that area
Oman Oil Company, a national oil investment company of Oman
Order of Canada
Organ-on-a-chip

Computer science 
Object-Oriented Code, programming paradigm

See also
 Out of Control (disambiguation)